The House of Saltykov is the name of an old Russian noble family which can trace their ancestry back to 1240. In March 1730 the family was awarded with the title of Count in Russia, granted to them by Empress Anna of Russia.

Notable family members
 Aleksey Saltykov (disambiguation), several people
 Darya Nikolayevna Saltykova (1730–1801), Russian serial killer
 Darya Petrovna Saltykova (1739–1802), Russian lady-in-waiting and socialite
 Irina Saltykova (born 1966), Russian pop singer 
 Ivan Saltykov (1730–1805), Russian Field-Marshal
 Mikhail Saltykov-Shchedrin (1826–1889), leading Russian satirist, known under his pen name Shchedrin
 Nikolai Saltykov (1736–1816), Russian field marshal
 Praskovia Saltykova (1664–1723), Tsarina, wife of Ivan V of Russia
 Pyotr Saltykov (1698–1772), Russian statesman
 Sergei Saltykov (c. 1726 – 1765), Russian noble, first lover of Catherine the Great

See also
 Sołtyk coat of arms, for the Polish branch of this noble family.

Russian noble families